Sandra Donnelly (born 26 September 1969) is a Canadian equestrian. She competed in two events at the 2008 Summer Olympics.

References

External links
 

1969 births
Living people
Canadian female equestrians
Olympic equestrians of Canada
Equestrians at the 2008 Summer Olympics
Pan American Games medalists in equestrian
Pan American Games silver medalists for Canada
Equestrians at the 2007 Pan American Games
Sportspeople from Calgary
Medalists at the 2007 Pan American Games
21st-century Canadian women
20th-century Canadian women